Kosovo participated at the 2016 Summer Olympics in Rio de Janeiro, Brazil from 5 to 21 August 2016. It was represented by the Olympic Committee of Kosovo (KOK/OKK) with a delegation of eight people, including three men and five women. Most of them were awarded places in their respective sporting events through wild card entries and Tripartite Commission invitations. Two Kosovar athletes, on the other hand, qualified directly for the Olympics on merit: judoka Nora Gjakova (women's 57 kg) and Majlinda Kelmendi (women's 52 kg), the lone returning Olympian on the team after representing Albania four years earlier in London. The world's top-ranked judoka in her weight category and the frontrunner for the country's first Olympic medal, Kelmendi was selected to become Kosovo's flag bearer in the opening ceremony.

Kosovo left Rio de Janeiro with its first Olympic gold medal, won by Kelmendi.

Background

This was Kosovo's first participation in the Olympics since gaining membership by the International Olympic Committee (IOC) in December 2014. Serbia protested Kosovo's admission to the IOC, as it officially claims that Kosovo is an autonomous province of Serbia. However, Serbia, considering the harmful effects of Yugoslavia's expulsion in 1992, decided against boycotting the 2016 Rio Olympics as a consequence. Kosovo is currently recognised as a state by 97 UN member states.

Medalists

Athletics

Kosovar athletes have achieved qualifying standards in the following athletics events (up to a maximum of 3 athletes in each event):

Track & road events

Cycling

Road
Kosovo has received an invitation from the Tripartite Commission to send a rider competing in the men's road race to the Olympics.

Judo

Kosovo has qualified two judokas for each of the following weight classes at the Games. Nora Gjakova and Majlinda Kelmendi, who previously represented Albania at the 2012 Summer Olympics, were ranked among the top 14 for women in the IJF World Ranking List of May 30, 2016.

Shooting

Kosovo has received an invitation from the Tripartite Commission to send a women's 10 m air rifle shooter to the Olympics, as long as the minimum qualifying score (MQS) was fulfilled by March 31, 2016.

Swimming

Kosovo has received a Universality invitation from FINA to send two swimmers (one male and one female) to the Olympics.

References

Olympics
2016
Kosovo